The 1924 Loyola University Chicago football team was an American football team that represented Loyola University Chicago as an independent during the 1924 college football season. Led by Roger Kiley in his second season as head coach, the Ramblers compiled an overall record of 5–2–2.

Schedule

References

Loyola
Loyola Ramblers football seasons
Loyola University Chicago football